Suzanne Kamata (born September 29, 1965) is an American author and educator.

About 
Kamata was born in Grand Haven, Michigan on September 29, 1965. She studied at Kalamazoo College, the University of South Carolina, and has an MFA in creative writing from the University of British Columbia. She is an associate professor at Naruto University of Education in Japan.

Awards and honors 
 2019 NCT Asia (National Consortium for Teaching About Asia) Honorable Mention YA/High School Literature - for Indigo Girl
 2014  Asian/Pacific American Award for Literature, Honor Award - for Gadget Girl: The Art of Being Invisible
 2014  Skipping Stones, Multicultural and International Honor Award - for Gadget Girl: The Art of Being Invisible
 2013  Next Generation Indie Book Awards, Finalist - for Gadget Girl: The Art of Being Invisible
 Named Book of Outstanding Merit by Bank Street College - Gadget Girl: The Art of Being Invisible
 Grand Prize Winner of the Paris Book Festival - for Gadget Girl: The Art of Being Invisible
 Sakura Medal Nominee - for Gadget Girl: The Art of Being Invisible
 International Book Award Winner for YA - Gadget Girl: The Art of Being Invisible

Publications 
Her short stories, essays, articles and book reviews have appeared in over 100 publications including Real Simple, Brain, Child, Cicada, and The Japan Times.

Novels
2008  Losing Kei (Leapfrog Press, 2008)
2013  Gadget Girl: The Art of Being Invisible (GemmaMedia, 2013)
2014  Screaming Divas (Simon Pulse, 2014)
2017  The Mermaids of Lake Michigan (Wyatt-Mackenzie, 2017)
2019  Indigo Girl (GemmaMedia, 2019)

Travel memoirs
2017  A Girls’ Guide to the Islands (Gemma Open Door, 2017)
2019  Squeaky Wheels: Travels with my Daughter by Train, Plane, Metro, Tuk-tuk and Wheelchair (Wyatt-Mackenzie, 2019)

Short story collection
The Beautiful One Has Come

References

External links 
 Suzanne Kamata website
 Interview - on Writing Matters

1965 births
Living people
American women educators
21st-century American women